Jim Field is a British illustrator from London, who now lives in Paris with his wife and daughter.

Early life 
Field studied animation at Hull School of Art and Design, graduated in 2002, paving his way into the animation industry working as a director for Partizan in London.

Career 
Field is the illustrator of picture book series "Oi Frog" written by Kes Gray, which was made into
a West End show in 2020. Field also illustrated The Lion Inside series with Rachel Bright (author).

In 2021 Field illustrated The Christmas Pig written by J K Rowling.

Awards 
Booktrust Roald Dahl Funny Prize (2011, won - Cats Ahoy) 

Laugh Out Loud book awards (The Lollies) (2016, won - The Parent Agency) 

Oscar's Book Prize (2017, won - The Koala Who Could)

Sainsbury's Children's Book Awards (2020, won - Oi See it! Say It)

References 

French illustrators

British illustrators

Living people

Year of birth missing (living people)